The OVW Heavyweight Championship is a professional wrestling heavyweight championship owned by the Ohio Valley Wrestling (OVW) promotion. The original championship was designed and created in 1997 by Reggie Parks. The title was introduced on August 17, 1997 at an OVW live event, then known as the NWA-OVW Heavyweight Championship due to OVW's relationship with the National Wrestling Alliance (NWA) governing body. OVW eventually parted ways with the NWA in October 2001, and the title was renamed the OVW Heavyweight Championship. OVW later became a developmental territory for the World Wrestling Entertainment organization, but their partnership eventually ceased on February 7, 2008. The title has no known weight-limit, even though it is a heavyweight championship. The title has also went through almost 3 different versions in its current twenty-four year run. With The first being made by Reggie Parks in 1997, which was then retired and vacated in early 2012. The second version would then be made by Reggie Parks and Dave Millican for OVW. The current version however was designed and created by Top Rope Belts, and ended up being used from 2012 to the present day.

Title changes happen mostly at OVW-promoted events. The inaugural champion was a man known as Trailer Park Trash. His reign began on August 17, 1997, but ended in a vacancy for unknown reasons; it is also unknown how he became the first champion. Nick Dinsmore holds the record of most reigns, with ten. At 322 days, Rocco Bellagio's reign is the longest in the title's history. Rob Conway's fourth reign, Chet the Jett's second reign, and Vladimir Kozlov's only reign are all tied for the record of shortest reign in the title's history at less than one day each. Nick Dinsmore's combined ten reign lengths add up to 529 days—the most of any wrestler. The current champion is Ca$h Flo; the previous champion was James Storm, who lost the championship on October 13, 2022. Overall, there have been 135 reigns shared between 74 wrestlers, with 13 vacancies. One of those vacancies was due to then-champion Matt Cappotelli being diagnosed with a malignant brain tumor, and thus he chose to vacate the championship.

Title history

Names

Reigns

Combined reigns

See also
OVW National Heavyweight Championship
OVW Southern Tag Team Championship
OVW Television Championship
OVW Women's Championship

References
Specific

General

External links
 OVW Heavyweight Title History at Cagematch.net

1997 establishments in Kentucky
Ohio Valley Wrestling championships
Heavyweight wrestling championships
Recurring sporting events established in 1997